St Peter’s Church, Parwich is a Grade II* listed parish church in the Church of England in Parwich, Derbyshire.

History

The medieval church was demolished and the current building of Coxbench stone erected between 1872 and 1873 by Henry Isaac Stevens and Frederick Josias Robinson, funded by Sir Thomas William Evans. It was opened on 17 October 1873. The carving was executed by Harry Hems, sculptor of Exeter, and the contractor was W.H. and J. Slater of Derby.

Parish status

The church is in a joint parish with
St Michael and All Angels’ Church, Alsop-en-le-Dale
St Edmund’s Church, Fenny Bentley
St Leonard’s Church, Thorpe
St Mary's Church, Tissington

Organ

The church contains a pipe organ by Abbott and Smith dating from 1873. A specification of the organ can be found on the National Pipe Organ Register.

See also
Grade II* listed buildings in Derbyshire Dales
Listed buildings in Parwich

References

Church of England church buildings in Derbyshire
Grade II* listed churches in Derbyshire
Churches completed in 1873